Microphysogobio nudiventris is a species of cyprinid fish found in the Du-He River in China.

References

Cyprinid fish of Asia
Freshwater fish of China
Fish described in 2012
Microphysogobio